Sullivan's Bridge is a trail bridge that connects the Schuylkill River Trail to Valley Forge National Park. The bridge was completed as part of the U.S. Route 422 (US 422) improvement project at a cost of $10 million. Construction began in 2014 and completed in 2017. The structure replaces an old wooden structure that previously required cyclists to dismount while crossing. The bridge is named in honor of General John Sullivan who was charged by George Washington to build a bridge over the Schuylkill River around the time of the 1777-78 winter encampment.  The old Valley Forge Park station can be seen from this bridge.

References

See also
 
 
 
 List of crossings of the Schuylkill River

Bridges in Montgomery County, Pennsylvania
Transportation in Montgomery County, Pennsylvania